Gərmətük (also, Germatuk and Germatyuk) is an urban-type settlement and municipality in the Lankaran Rayon of Azerbaijan. It has a population of 5,556. The municipality consists of the villages of Gərmətük and Velədi.

References 

Populated places in Lankaran District